Ritz ballistic theory is a theory in physics, first published in 1908 by Swiss physicist Walther Ritz. In 1908, Ritz published Recherches critiques sur l'Électrodynamique générale, a lengthy criticism of Maxwell-Lorentz electromagnetic theory, in which he contended that the theory's connection with the luminiferous aether (see Lorentz ether theory) made it "essentially inappropriate to express the comprehensive laws for the propagation of electrodynamic actions."

Ritz proposed a new equation, derived from the principles of the ballistic theory of electromagnetic waves, a theory competing with the special theory of relativity. The equation relates the force between two charged particles with a radial separation r relative velocity v and relative acceleration a, where k is an undetermined parameter from the general form of Ampere's force law as proposed by Maxwell. The equation obeys Newton's third law and forms the basis of Ritz's electrodynamics.

Derivation of Ritz's equation
This gives us an equation of the form:

.

The stationary coordinates of the observer relate to the moving frame of the charge as follows

Developing the terms in the force equation, we find that the density of particles is given by

We can also develop expressions for the retarded radius  and velocity  using Taylor series expansions

With these substitutions, we find that the force equation is now

Next we develop the series representations of the coefficients

With these substitutions, the force equation becomes

Since the equation must reduce to the Coulomb force law when the relative velocities are zero, we immediately know that .

To determine the other coefficients, we consider the force on a linear circuit using Ritz's expression, and compare the terms with the general form of Ampere's law. The second derivative of Ritz's equation is

Consider the diagram on the right, and note that ,

Plugging these expressions into Ritz's equation, we obtain the following

Comparing to the original expression for Ampere's force law

we obtain the coefficients in Ritz's equation

From this we obtain the full expression of Ritz's electrodynamic equation with one unknown

In a footnote at the end of Ritz's section on Gravitation  ( English translation) the editor says, "Ritz used k = 6.4 to reconcile his formula (to calculate the angle of advancement of perihelion of planets per century) with the observed anomaly for Mercury (41") however recent data give 43.1", which leads to k = 7. Substituting this result into Ritz's formula yields exactly the general relativity formula." Using this same integer value for k in Ritz's electrodynamic equation we get:

References and notes

Further reading
  
 

History of physics